Mansonia gagei is a species of flowering plant in the family Malvaceae. It is found in Southeast and South Asia.

References

Helicteroideae
Trees of Indo-China